The Morning News was a right wing English language newspaper published from Dhaka.

History
The Morning News started as an English language newspaper in Kolkata weekly. It was owned by Khwaja Nuruddin who was a relative of the Nawab of Dhaka, and Sir Khawaja Nazimuddin. It moved to Dhaka on 20 March 1949 following the Partition of India. On 25 December 1949, it started publishing as a daily newspaper. The editor of the newspaper was Badruddin. On 24 January 1971, the office of the Morning News and the other pro-Pakistan Military junta newspaper, Dainik Pakistan, was burned down by protestors. On 2 March 1971, Pakistani soldiers shot at protesters outside the newspaper office at DIT intersection around 9:30 pm. After the Independence of Bangladesh in 1971 Shamsul Huda became the editor. The Newspaper was banned in 1975 by the BAKSAL government.

Ideology
The Morning News was supportive of the Muslim League faction led by Sir Khawaja Nazimuddin. The Morning News was against the Language Movement in 1952. It called the movement demanding Bengali be made the state language of Pakistan a conspiracy of Indians and Hindus. The newspaper took a communal stance.

References

Publications established in 1949
English-language newspapers published in Bangladesh
1949 establishments in East Pakistan
Newspapers published in Dhaka
Daily newspapers published in Bangladesh